Portugal is set to participate in the Eurovision Song Contest 2023 in Liverpool, United Kingdom, with "" performed by Mimicat. The Portuguese broadcaster  (RTP) organised the national final  2023 in order to select the Portuguese entry for the 2023 contest.

Background 

Prior to the 2023 contest, Portugal has participated in the Eurovision Song Contest 53 times since its first entry in 1964. Following the introduction of semi-finals for the 2004, Portugal had featured in only seven finals. Portugal has also received nul points on two occasions; in 1964 and 1997. In , Portugal placed ninth with the song "" performed by Maro.

The Portuguese national broadcaster,  (RTP), broadcasts the event within Portugal and organises the selection process for the nation's entry. RTP confirmed Portugal's participation in the 2023 Eurovision Song Contest on 2 September 2022. Along with their participation confirmation, the broadcaster announced the organization of  2023 in order to select the 2023 Portuguese entry.

Before Eurovision

Festival da Canção 2023 
 2023 was the 57th edition of  that selected Portugal's entry for the Eurovision Song Contest 2023. The competition consisted of two semi-finals on 25 February and 4 March 2023 with twenty entries competing in total, leading to a 12-song final on 11 March 2023.

Format 
The format of the competition consisted of three shows: two semi-finals and a final. Each semi-final featured 10 competing entries from which six advanced from each show to complete the 12-song lineup in the final. Results during the semi-finals were determined by the votes from a jury panel appointed by RTP and public televoting; the first five qualifiers were based on the 50/50 combination of jury and public voting where both streams of voting assign points from 1–8, 10 and 12 based on ranking, while the sixth qualifier was determined by a second round of public televoting from the remaining entries. Results during the final were determined by the 50/50 combination of votes from seven regional juries and public televoting, which was opened following the second semi-final and closed during the final show. Both the public televote and the juries assign points from 1–8, 10 and 12 based on the ranking developed by both streams of voting.

Competing entries 
Twenty composers were selected by RTP through two methods: 15 invited by RTP for the competition and five selected from 667 submissions received through an open call for songs. The composers, which both create the songs and select its performers, were required to submit the demo and final versions of their entries by 31 October and 30 November 2022, respectively. Songs could be submitted in any language. The selected composers were revealed on 9 November 2022, while the competing artists and songs were revealed on 19 January 2023. Among the competing artists was Cláudia Pascoal, who represented Portugal in the Eurovision Song Contest 2018.

Semi-finals 
The two semi-finals took place on 25 February and 4 March 2023. One additional entry was then selected by televoting exclusively. The first semi-final was hosted by Tânia Ribas de Oliveira and José Carlos Malato. Throughout all shows,  was in charge of the green room alongside Wandson Lisboa, the social media correspondent. In addition to the performances of the competing entries,  together with Nena,  and Wander Isaac, Fernando Tordo and  Blanca Paloma performed as guests in the first semi-final.

Esse Povo, who took part in the first semi-final with their song "", automatically qualified from the jury and televote round due to a technical issue related to their televoting line discovered during the first semi-final, resulting in the final featuring 13 artists instead of the planned 12.

Key:
 Jury and televote round qualifier
 Televote-only round qualifier

Final 
Interval acts included a The Beatles medley by Eurovision Song Contest 2017 winner Salvador Sobral, a reprise of "Saudade, saudade" by Maro featuring several finalists of Festival da Canção 2022, and a medley of songs from Liverpudlian artists by David Fonseca. The winner was selected based on the 50/50 combination of votes from seven regional juries and from a public televote.

At Eurovision 
According to Eurovision rules, all nations with the exceptions of the host country and the "Big Five" (France, Germany, Italy, Spain and the United Kingdom) are required to qualify from one of two semi-finals in order to compete for the final; the top 10 countries from each semi-final progress to the final. The European Broadcasting Union (EBU) split up the competing countries into six different pots based on voting patterns from previous contests, with countries with favourable voting histories put into the same pot. On 31 January 2023, an allocation draw was held, which placed each country into one of the two semi-finals, and determined which half of the show they would perform in. Portugal has been placed into the first semi-final, to be held on 9 May 2023, and has been scheduled to perform in the first half of the show.

References

External links 

 

2023
Countries in the Eurovision Song Contest 2023
Eurovision